Shumaker is a surname, being an Americanized form of the German surname Schumacher. Notable people with the surname include:

Anthony Shumaker (born 1973), American former baseball pitcher
Edward Shumaker (1896-1973), American sports shooter
John Shumaker (1929-1999), American politician
John W. Shumaker (born 1942), American educator
Robert H. Shumaker (born 1933), American retired rear admiral and naval aviator

See also
Shumaker-Lewis House, a historic home in West Virginia
Shumaker Naval Ammunition Depot, a munitions manufacturing facility in Arkansas
Schumacher
Schoemaker
Shoemaker (surname)
Schumaker